Divorcing Jackmay refer to:

 Divorcing Jack (novel), a 1994 novel by Colin Bateman
 Divorcing Jack (film), a 1998 film, based on the novel, starring David Thewlis